Praephostria is a genus of moths of the family Crambidae described by Hans Georg Amsel in 1956.

Species
Praephostria flavalis Amsel, 1956
Praephostria sylleptalis Amsel, 1956

References

Spilomelinae
Taxa named by Hans Georg Amsel
Crambidae genera